The World Figure Skating Championships is an annual figure skating competition sanctioned by the International Skating Union in which figure skaters compete for the title of World Champion.

The competitions took place from February 28 to March 1 in Berlin, Germany. It was the second year when all competitions were held at the same location and the same time, but the first time in Europe.

Results

Men

Judges:
 Ludwig Niedermayer 
 Ludwig Fänner 
 Eugen Minich 
 Walter Leo Hildburgh 
 Walter Jakobsson 
 Herbert J. Clarke 
 H. Pika

Ladies

Judges:
 W. L. Hildburgh 
 Kurt Dannenberg 
 S. Wallwork 
 Hans Grünauer 
 O. R. Kolderup 
 Erich Bartel 
 A. Anderberg

Pairs

Judges:
 S. Wallwork 
 W. L. Hildburgh 
 Walter Jakobsson 
 C. Schulze 
 Eugen Minich 
 J. Edhoffer 
 Erich Bartel

Sources
 Result list provided by the ISU

World Figure Skating Championships
World Figure Skating Championships
World 1931
World Figure Skating Championships, 1931
1931 in German sport
1930s in Berlin
February 1931 sports events
March 1931 sports events
Sports competitions in Berlin